Alcester-Hudson High School is the main secondary school for grades 9-12 located in Alcester, South Dakota.  The high school serves the cities of Alcester, South Dakota and Hudson, South Dakota.

History

The first students graduated from the Alcester's full high school in May 1911.  The graduating class consisted of two girls, Ethel Johnson and Myra Weed.

Alcester-Hudson High School was formed when Alcester High School of Alcester, South Dakota was merged with Hudson High School of Hudson, South Dakota.

School leadership 
 Tim Rhead, K-6 Principal, District Superintendent
 Natalie Stene, Business Manager
 Jason Van Engen, 7-12 Principal

Sports
The school offers students the ability to play in girls & boys basketball, volleyball, football, wrestling, golf and girls & boys track.

References

External links
Alcester-Hudson School website
SDHSAA school info

Public high schools in South Dakota
Schools in Union County, South Dakota